"Uh Huh" is a song recorded by American singer and songwriter Julia Michaels from her third extended play Nervous System (2017), served as the second track of the EP. The song was written by Michaels, Justin Tranter and its producers Mattias Larsson and Robin Fredriksson, who composed the duo Mattman & Robin. The song was released by Republic Records as the second single from Nervous System on June 2, 2017. "Uh Huh" is a midtempo guitar-driven punk pop song that talks about the fight of mind and emotion. Michaels described as “the feeling of the breath before the kiss”.

It was accompanied by a music video directed by Emil Nava premiered on her Vevo channel on July 24, 2017.

Background and writing
"Uh Huh" was written in April 2017 by Julia Michaels, Justin Tranter, Robin Fredriksson and Mattias Larsson. About the idea of the song, Michaels said "I really wanted to capture that initial feeling of being next to somebody that you want so bad to kiss you...and it hasn't happened yet."

Recording and composition
Recording sessions for the song took place at Wolf Cousins Studios, Stockholm, Sweden and MXM Studios, Los Angeles, California and was engineered by Sam Holland and Cory Bice with assistance from Jeremy Lertola. The producers of the song, Mattman & Robin, did the programming and played drums, percussion, toms, guitar, bass, piano, synths and claps and background vocals were provided by Michaels and Tranter. Mark “Spike” Stent mixed the track and Randy Merrill completed the audio mastering at Sterling Sound, New York City.

Musically, "Uh Huh" is a two minutes and fifty-seven seconds mid-tempo pop song with punk pop influences. In terms of music notation, "Uh Huh" was composed using  common time in the key of E major, with a moderate tempo of 69 beats per minute. The song follows the chord progression of E-Cm-Gm-A and Michaels' vocal range spans from the low note B3 to the high note of F5, giving the song one octave and five notes of range.

Lyrically, the song talks about the fight of mind and emotion which Michaels has described as "the feeling of the breath before the kiss."

Music video

Background and release
The official lyric video for the song was released on June 11, 2017 on Michael's YouTube and Vevo channels. The official music video was released on July 25, 2017 and it was directed by Emil Nava and produced by MaryAnn Tanedo. Michaels' love interest in the music video is Thomas Edwin. The music video was recorded in a set at Los Angeles, California.

Synopsis

The music video starts with a "very personal" and "candid" conversation about breakups, life, love and family between Michaels and Edwin. Nava asked them to start the shoot like that, he said "We forced a conversation that you would never have on the first date...We made a point of really trying to scratch the surface on the first conversation." The music video has a reference to the movie Birdman, when Michaels is in one location but the colors are changing. The scene of switching clothes between suit and dress, was Michaels' idea. About that Michaels said "I think something that is really incredible, especially in this day in age, is sexuality and exploring that with each other, and feeling so comfortable with each other that you can do that."

Critical reception
Mike Wass of Idolator called it "brighter, bolder and more instant" than her previous single "Issues", as well labeling the chorus as "obscenely catchy". He also claimed "it doesn't sound like anything else on radio, which is quite an achievement given that her sparse, emotional approach is being imitated by everyone from songwriting clients to random copycats." MTVs Madeline Roth said "the songwriter-to-the-stars has unleashed 'Uh Huh', a loved-up earworm that finds her crazy in lust with a special someone. This bop should have no issues creepin' onto your summertime playlist." Raisa Bruner of Time stated "the singer-songwriter behind 'Issues' now brings us second single 'Uh Huh', a more up-tempo modern pop tune with an acoustic scratchiness and unexpected vocal kick. Michaels is making her mark on the pop landscape with her ability to keep coming up with songs that sound completely different from other charting tunes."

Credits and personnel
Recording and management
 Recorded at Wolf Cousins Studios (Stockholm, Sweden) and MXM Studios (Los Angeles, California)
 Mastered at Sterling Sound (New York City)
 Thanks For The Songs Richard (BMI) All Rights on behalf of Itself and Thanks For The Songs Richard Administered by Warner-Tamerlane Publishing Corp., Wolf Cousins (STIM)/Warner Chappell Music Scandinavia (STIM), Justin’s School for Girls (BMI) Warner-Tamerlane Publishing Corp (BMI)

Personnel

Julia Michaels – vocals, songwriting, background vocals
Justin Tranter – songwriting, background vocals
Mattias Larsson – songwriting; production , programming, drums, percussion, toms, guitar, bass, piano, synths, claps 
Robin Fredriksson – songwriting; production , programming, drums, percussion, toms, guitar, bass, piano, synths, claps 
Sam Holland – engineering
Cory Bice – engineering
Jeremy Lertola – assistant engineering
Mark “Spike” Stent – mixing
Randy Merrill – mastering

Credits adapted from Nervous System liner notes.

Charts

Release history

References

Julia Michaels songs
2017 singles
2017 songs
Republic Records singles
Songs written by Julia Michaels
Songs written by Mattias Larsson
Songs written by Robin Fredriksson
Songs written by Justin Tranter
Song recordings produced by Mattman & Robin
Universal Music Group singles